Adams Township, Indiana is the name of the following places in the U.S.:

 Adams Township, Allen County, Indiana
 Adams Township, Carroll County, Indiana
 Adams Township, Cass County, Indiana
 Adams Township, Decatur County, Indiana
 Adams Township, Hamilton County, Indiana
 Adams Township, Madison County, Indiana
 Adams Township, Morgan County, Indiana
 Adams Township, Parke County, Indiana
 Adams Township, Ripley County, Indiana
 Adams Township, Warren County, Indiana

See also
 Adams, Indiana
 Adams County, Indiana

Indiana township disambiguation pages